Kaew Lom Phet (lit. "glass encircles diamonds") is a Thai television soap opera produced by Xact and Scenario and broadcast on Channel 5 in 2008–2009. It is a remake of the 2001 drama Lueat Hong.

Cast

Kitjakorns
Son Songpaisarn as Cheewin Chayatorn Setjinda as Karn Airin Yoogthatat as KaewkaoChaiyapol Pupart as ChanokUtumporn Silapan as LadaChomchay Chatwilai as SajeeTatsana Seneewong Na Ayuthaya as Pin

Pikul's family
Kamolchanok Komoltithi as Pikul Wannarot Sonthichai as NampetchThong Wattana as Det

Broadcasting
KVLA 56.5: August 11, 2014 - September 14, 2014

Running Time
35 min. (1-35 Set)
45 min. (Ntry Set, Sohu Dubbed Version)
Random (Regular)

References

Sources

Channel 5 (Thailand) original programming
Thai television soap operas
2000s Thai television series
2008 Thai television series debuts
2009 Thai television series endings